The 1972 Eastern Illinois Panthers football team represented Eastern Illinois University as an independent during the 1972 NCAA College Division football season. Led by first-year head coach Jack Dean, the Panthers compiled a record of 1–9. They played their home games at O'Brien Stadium in Charleston, Illinois.

Schedule

References

Eastern Illinois
Eastern Illinois Panthers football seasons
Eastern Illinois Panthers football